Pennsylvania Route 445 (PA 445) is a  state highway located in Centre County, Pennsylvania.  The southern terminus is at PA 45 in Millheim.  The northern terminus is at PA 64 in Nittany.

Route description

PA 445 begins at an intersection with PA 45 in the borough of Millheim in the Penns Valley, heading north on two-lane undivided North Street. The road heads through residential areas with some farms, running to the west of Elk Creek. The route crosses into Penn Township and becomes an unnamed road, heading north across forested Brush Mountain. PA 445 enters Miles Township and continues into the agricultural Brush Valley, passing through Spring Bank and reaching an intersection with PA 192. At this point, the route turns west to form a concurrency with PA 192 on Brush Valley Road, passing more farms. PA 445 splits from PA 192 by heading north on Madisonburg Park through the residential community of Madisonburg. The route heads north across forested Nittany Mountain, becoming Madisonburg Pike Road. The road ascends the mountain by making a sharp turn to the west, a hairpin turn to the northeast, and a hairpin turn to the west. The route turns north and crosses into Walker Township. PA 445 becomes Gingerick Gap Road and winds north across more of the mountain. After crossing Nittany Mountain, the route turns northwest and passes through a mix of farms, woods, and homes before ending at PA 64 in Nittany.

Major intersections

See also

References

External links

Pennsylvania Highways: PA 445

445
Transportation in Centre County, Pennsylvania